The NO-MZ 2B is a Vietnamese anti-personnel fragmentation mine. The mine has a simple cylindrical metal body, with an MUV fuze screwed into the top of the mine. The main charge is surrounded by a number of steel fragments embedded in wax.

The mine is found in Cambodia and Vietnam as well as possibly Laos and Thailand.

Specifications
 Height: 80 mm
 Diameter: 57 mm
 Weight: 0.66 kg
 Explosive content: 0.065 kg of TNT
 Operating pressure: 2 to 5 kg of pull

References
 Jane's Mines and Mine Clearance 2005-2006
 Brassey's Essential Guide to Anti-Personnel Landmines, Eddie Banks

External links
 

Anti-personnel mines